Kozlovo is a rural locality (a village) in Gorod Vyazniki, Vyaznikovsky District, Vladimir Oblast, Russia. The population was 153 as of 2010.

Geography 
Kozlovo is located 13 km north of Vyazniki (the district's administrative centre) by road. Palkino is the nearest rural locality.

References 

Rural localities in Vyaznikovsky District